Everything, is the seven-track EP recorded by Japanese pop rock band Mr. Children, released under the record label Toy's Factory in May 1992. It has generally been considered their first studio album.

In 1991, the band met the record producer Takeshi Kobayashi for the first time. They started the recording together in December of that year, at the Sound Sky and Starship studios. Although the producer suggested changing its lyrics slightly, all songs appeared on the EP had already been written before they signed a recording contract, and also played in their early live performances.

Everything had a steady sales after the band gained public recognition, reaching the top-30 on the Japanese Oricon albums chart and spending 83 weeks on the top-100 with sales of over 450,000 copies. In June 1998, it was certified double-platinum by the Recording Industry Association of Japan for shipments of over 800,000 units.

After the EP came out, they embarked on concert tour with fellow band The Pillows. In August 1992, "Kimi ga Ita Natsu" was issued as the only single from Everything.

Track listing

Personnel 
Mr. Children
 Vocals, guitar: Kazutoshi Sakurai
 Guitar: Kenichi Tahara
 Bass: Keisuke Nakagawa
 Drums: Hideya Suzuki

Production
Production credits for album:

 Producer: Takeshi Kobyashi
 Executive producer: Takamitsu Ide, Mitsunori Kadoike
 Co-producer: Koichi Inaba and Mr. Children
 Arranger: Takeshi Kobyashi and Mr. Children
 Engineer: Kunihiko Imai
 Assistant engineer: Hiroshi Tanigawa, Hideyuki Arima, Toshihiko Kataoka, and Tomoaki Sato
 Mixed by: Kunihiko Imai at Vincent Studio
 Computer programming: Yoshinori Kadoya
 Assistant director: Makoto Nakahishi
 Recorded by: Sound Sky Studio, Power House
 Mastered by: Mitsukazu Tanaka at Sony Shinanomachi Studio
 Sound effects: Hirokazu Ogura, Takeshi Yamamoto
 Toy's Factory staff: Masayuki Nakagawa, Yukari Nishioka 
 Recording co-coordination: Hiroe Takeshima
 Artist management: Isao Tanuma
 Sub management: Kazushiro Miura (assisted by Tomoko Okada)
 Art director: Mitsuo Shindo
 Designer: Kumiko Tezuka
 Photographer: Mitsuo Shindo, Kiyonori Okuyama, and Masako Saito
 Stylist: Hiroko Umeyama and Akemi Mutoh
 Hair and make-up: Akemi Nakano and Megumi Hiraoku
 Illustrator: Hikaru Kawahara

Charts

Peak positions

Year-end charts

Certifications

References 

1992 debut albums
Mr. Children albums
Albums produced by Takeshi Kobayashi